Spain competed at the 1932 Summer Olympics in Los Angeles, United States. Seven competitors, all men, took part in four events in three sports.

Medalists

Bronze
Santiago Amat — Sailing, Men's Monotype Class

Sailing

Shooting

Five shooters represented Spain in 1932.
Men

Art competitions

References

External links
Spanish Olympic Committee
Official Olympic Reports
International Olympic Committee results database

Nations at the 1932 Summer Olympics
1932
Oly